Eugen Kvaternik Square (also known as Kvaternikov trg or nicknamed Kvaternjak or Kvatrić by locals) is a square located on the border between Maksimir, Gornji Grad - Medveščak and Donji Grad city districts of Zagreb, Croatia. It marks the intersection of Vlaška Street, Dragutin Domjanić Street, Maksimirska Street, Vjekoslav Heinzel Avenue, and Šubićeva Street. Kvaternik Square is one of the most frequented squares in Zagreb.

The square has recently undergone a large renovation project. The renewed square incorporates an underground parking garage. However, the renewal has been met with resistance from nearby inhabitants for functional and aesthetic reasons. The square is a major transport hub within Zagreb, with ZET tram routes 4, 5, 7, 11, 12 and 13 traversing or terminating at the square.

References

External links

Squares in Zagreb
Maksimir